The IS-4 Jastrząb (Instytut Szybownictwa – gliding institute) was a single-seat aerobatic glider designed and built in Poland from 1949.

Development 
The IS-4 was built for aerobatics with a high structural strength and a very high maximum speed which could not be achieved in a vertical dive. Due to the pilot's sitting position and the arrangements of the controls, it was difficult for pilots to exceed the 8g loading limit. During high speed flight it was possible for the air-brakes to be sucked out violently, so most pilots ensured that they remained closed by holding the airbrake control.

Variants 
 IS-4 Jastrząb – two prototypes built in 1949.
 IS-4 Jastrząb bis – Thirty-five production aircraft, three of which were exported.

Specifications (IS-4 Jastrząb bis)

See also

References

Further reading
  Taylor, J. H. (ed) (1989) Jane's Encyclopedia of Aviation. Studio Editions: London. p. 29

External links

 http://www.piotrp.de/SZYBOWCE/pis4.htm
 https://web.archive.org/web/20100501051452/http://kionastore.com/plan-1530.html
 http://www.vintagesailplanes.de/szd__4.htm

1940s Polish sailplanes
Aircraft first flown in 1949